The Braille pattern dots-134 is a 6-dot braille cell with both top and the bottom left dots raised, or an 8-dot braille cell with both top and the lower-middle left dots raised. It is represented by the Unicode code point U+280d, and in Braille ASCII with M.

Unified Braille

In unified international braille, the braille pattern dots-134 is used to represent a bilabial nasal, i.e. /m/.

Table of unified braille values

Other braille

Plus dots 7 and 8

Related to Braille pattern dots-134 are Braille patterns 1347, 1348, and 13478, which are used in 8-dot braille systems, such as Gardner-Salinas and Luxembourgish Braille.

Related 8-dot kantenji patterns

In the Japanese kantenji braille, the standard 8-dot Braille patterns 257, 1257, 2457, and 12457 are the patterns related to Braille pattern dots-134, since the two additional dots of kantenji patterns 0134, 1347, and 01347 are placed above the base 6-dot cell, instead of below, as in standard 8-dot braille.

Kantenji using braille patterns 257, 1257, 2457, or 12457

This listing includes kantenji using Braille pattern dots-134 for all 6349 kanji found in JIS C 6226-1978.

  - 力

Variants and thematic compounds

  -  selector 1 + ぬ/力  =  刃
  -  selector 1 + selector 1 + ぬ/力  =  刄
  -  selector 4 + ぬ/力  =  刀
  -  selector 6 + ぬ/力  =  臼
  -  比 + ぬ/力  =  匁
  -  ぬ/力 + 宿  =  免
  -  ぬ/力 + お/頁  =  負

Compounds of 力

  -  た/⽥ + ぬ/力  =  男
  -  ぬ/力 + た/⽥  =  勇
  -  に/氵 + ぬ/力 + た/⽥  =  湧
  -  み/耳 + ぬ/力 + た/⽥  =  踴
  -  す/発 + ぬ/力  =  虜
  -  ふ/女 + た/⽥ + ぬ/力  =  嫐
  -  せ/食 + た/⽥ + ぬ/力  =  甥
  -  ぬ/力 + た/⽥ + ぬ/力  =  舅
  -  ぬ/力 + れ/口  =  加
  -  ぬ/力 + を/貝  =  賀
  -  つ/土 + ぬ/力  =  嘉
  -  き/木 + ぬ/力 + れ/口  =  枷
  -  へ/⺩ + ぬ/力 + れ/口  =  珈
  -  や/疒 + ぬ/力 + れ/口  =  痂
  -  ち/竹 + ぬ/力 + れ/口  =  笳
  -  心 + ぬ/力 + れ/口  =  茄
  -  ね/示 + ぬ/力 + れ/口  =  袈
  -  み/耳 + ぬ/力 + れ/口  =  跏
  -  ひ/辶 + ぬ/力 + れ/口  =  迦
  -  そ/馬 + ぬ/力 + れ/口  =  駕
  -  こ/子 + ぬ/力  =  功
  -  そ/馬 + ぬ/力  =  劣
  -  龸 + ぬ/力  =  労
  -  龸 + 龸 + ぬ/力  =  勞
  -  て/扌 + 龸 + ぬ/力  =  撈
  -  や/疒 + 龸 + ぬ/力  =  癆
  -  ち/竹 + ぬ/力  =  効
  -  ゐ/幺 + ぬ/力  =  劾
  -  り/分 + ぬ/力  =  動
  -  る/忄 + り/分 + ぬ/力  =  慟
  -  も/門 + ぬ/力  =  勘
  -  よ/广 + ぬ/力  =  務
  -  く/艹 + ぬ/力  =  募
  -  火 + ぬ/力  =  勢
  -  ろ/十 + ぬ/力  =  協
  -  ぬ/力 + そ/馬  =  助
  -  日 + ぬ/力 + そ/馬  =  勗
  -  こ/子 + ぬ/力 + そ/馬  =  耡
  -  く/艹 + ぬ/力 + そ/馬  =  莇
  -  か/金 + ぬ/力 + そ/馬  =  鋤
  -  ぬ/力 + ゑ/訁  =  努
  -  ぬ/力 + ま/石  =  励
  -  ぬ/力 + ろ/十  =  勃
  -  に/氵 + ぬ/力 + ろ/十  =  渤
  -  ぬ/力 + 数  =  勅
  -  ぬ/力 + き/木  =  勤
  -  ぬ/力 + 火  =  勲
  -  ぬ/力 + ぬ/力 + 火  =  勳
  -  ぬ/力 + ら/月  =  脅
  -  ぬ/力 + ぬ/力 + ま/石  =  勵
  -  ぬ/力 + つ/土 + こ/子  =  劫
  -  ぬ/力 + も/門 + selector 5  =  劬
  -  ぬ/力 + つ/土 + れ/口  =  劼
  -  け/犬 + 宿 + ぬ/力  =  勁
  -  ぬ/力 + 龸 + れ/口  =  勍
  -  と/戸 + 宿 + ぬ/力  =  勒
  -  ぬ/力 + む/車 + selector 2  =  勠
  -  ぬ/力 + へ/⺩ + を/貝  =  勣
  -  ぬ/力 + か/金 + き/木  =  勦
  -  ふ/女 + う/宀/#3 + ぬ/力  =  娚
  -  る/忄 + 宿 + ぬ/力  =  恊
  -  ぬ/力 + 宿 + 心  =  懃
  -  て/扌 + う/宀/#3 + ぬ/力  =  抛
  -  き/木 + う/宀/#3 + ぬ/力  =  朸
  -  か/金 + 龸 + ぬ/力  =  釛
  -  ぬ/力 + 宿 + せ/食  =  飭

Compounds of 刂

  -  ほ/方 + ぬ/力  =  列
  -  な/亻 + ぬ/力  =  例
  -  氷/氵 + ほ/方 + ぬ/力  =  冽
  -  に/氵 + ほ/方 + ぬ/力  =  洌
  -  ら/月 + ぬ/力  =  前
  -  ぬ/力 + て/扌  =  揃
  -  ぬ/力 + ら/月 + ぬ/力  =  剪
  -  ち/竹 + ら/月 + ぬ/力  =  箭
  -  む/車 + ら/月 + ぬ/力  =  翦
  -  を/貝 + ぬ/力  =  則
  -  仁/亻 + ぬ/力  =  側
  -  る/忄 + ぬ/力  =  惻
  -  氷/氵 + ぬ/力  =  測
  -  よ/广 + を/貝 + ぬ/力  =  厠
  -  め/目 + ぬ/力  =  刈
  -  く/艹 + め/目 + ぬ/力  =  苅
  -  か/金 + ぬ/力  =  刊
  -  の/禾 + ぬ/力  =  利
  -  な/亻 + の/禾 + ぬ/力  =  俐
  -  る/忄 + の/禾 + ぬ/力  =  悧
  -  心 + の/禾 + ぬ/力  =  梨
  -  そ/馬 + の/禾 + ぬ/力  =  犁
  -  む/車 + の/禾 + ぬ/力  =  蜊
  -  せ/食 + の/禾 + ぬ/力  =  鯏
  -  心 + 宿 + ぬ/力  =  莉
  -  ゆ/彳 + ぬ/力  =  到
  -  き/木 + ゆ/彳 + ぬ/力  =  椡
  -  せ/食 + ぬ/力  =  制
  -  し/巿 + ぬ/力  =  刷
  -  き/木 + ぬ/力  =  刺
  -  selector 1 + き/木 + ぬ/力  =  剌
  -  れ/口 + き/木 + ぬ/力  =  喇
  -  に/氵 + き/木 + ぬ/力  =  溂
  -  ⺼ + ぬ/力  =  削
  -  ま/石 + ぬ/力  =  剖
  -  み/耳 + ぬ/力  =  剥
  -  ふ/女 + ぬ/力  =  副
  -  宿 + ぬ/力  =  割
  -  お/頁 + ぬ/力  =  創
  -  へ/⺩ + ぬ/力  =  班
  -  や/疒 + ぬ/力  =  痢
  -  心 + ぬ/力  =  薊
  -  ぬ/力 + つ/土  =  型
  -  ぬ/力 + 数 + せ/食  =  刋
  -  ぬ/力 + selector 4 + 数  =  刎
  -  ぬ/力 + 宿 + て/扌  =  刔
  -  ぬ/力 + 宿 + へ/⺩  =  刪
  -  ぬ/力 + れ/口 + せ/食  =  刮
  -  ぬ/力 + 宿 + け/犬  =  刳
  -  ぬ/力 + ゆ/彳 + 宿  =  剃
  -  ろ/十 + 宿 + ぬ/力  =  剋
  -  ぬ/力 + 日 + 数  =  剔
  -  ぬ/力 + け/犬 + か/金  =  剞
  -  ぬ/力 + と/戸 + 宿  =  剳
  -  ぬ/力 + 宿 + や/疒  =  剴
  -  ぬ/力 + に/氵 + ね/示  =  剽
  -  ぬ/力 + ふ/女 + た/⽥  =  劃
  -  か/金 + 宿 + ぬ/力  =  劉
  -  よ/广 + 宿 + ぬ/力  =  廁
  -  に/氵 + 龸 + ぬ/力  =  渕

Compounds of 刃 and 刄

  -  ぬ/力 + 心  =  忍
  -  ゑ/訁 + ぬ/力  =  認
  -  い/糹/#2 + ぬ/力 + 心  =  綛
  -  心 + ぬ/力 + 心  =  荵
  -  な/亻 + selector 1 + ぬ/力  =  仞
  -  と/戸 + selector 1 + ぬ/力  =  靭
  -  と/戸 + ぬ/力  =  靱
  -  仁/亻 + selector 1 + ぬ/力  =  仭
  -  て/扌 + selector 1 + ぬ/力  =  扨
  -  の/禾 + selector 1 + ぬ/力  =  籾
  -  か/金 + selector 1 + ぬ/力  =  釼
  -  と/戸 + う/宀/#3 + ぬ/力  =  剏
  -  ぬ/力 + selector 1 + ⺼  =  衂

Compounds of 刀

  -  ぬ/力 + 囗  =  召
  -  て/扌 + ぬ/力  =  招
  -  日 + ぬ/力  =  昭
  -  に/氵 + ぬ/力  =  沼
  -  い/糹/#2 + ぬ/力  =  紹
  -  え/訁 + ぬ/力  =  詔
  -  は/辶 + ぬ/力  =  超
  -  ぬ/力 + ぬ/力 + 囗  =  劭
  -  そ/馬 + ぬ/力 + 囗  =  貂
  -  ひ/辶 + ぬ/力 + 囗  =  迢
  -  さ/阝 + ぬ/力 + 囗  =  邵
  -  ま/石 + ぬ/力 + 囗  =  韶
  -  と/戸 + ぬ/力 + 囗  =  髫
  -  な/亻 + 宿 + ぬ/力  =  仂
  -  ぬ/力 + ぬ/力 + 囗  =  劭
  -  れ/口 + ぬ/力  =  切
  -  ま/石 + れ/口 + ぬ/力  =  砌
  -  ね/示 + ぬ/力  =  初
  -  け/犬 + ぬ/力  =  券
  -  け/犬 + け/犬 + ぬ/力  =  劵
  -  き/木 + け/犬 + ぬ/力  =  椦
  -  う/宀/#3 + ぬ/力  =  寡
  -  ひ/辶 + ぬ/力  =  辺
  -  ぬ/力 + け/犬  =  契
  -  囗 + ぬ/力  =  喫
  -  き/木 + ぬ/力 + け/犬  =  楔
  -  ね/示 + ぬ/力 + け/犬  =  禊
  -  ぬ/力 + ⺼  =  盆
  -  れ/口 + selector 4 + ぬ/力  =  叨
  -  や/疒 + selector 4 + ぬ/力  =  屶
  -  て/扌 + selector 4 + ぬ/力  =  挈
  -  き/木 + selector 4 + ぬ/力  =  朷
  -  心 + selector 4 + ぬ/力  =  茘
  -  か/金 + selector 4 + ぬ/力  =  釖
  -  ぬ/力 + 宿 + こ/子  =  刧
  -  ぬ/力 + 宿 + ま/石  =  劈
  -  き/木 + 龸 + ぬ/力  =  枴
  -  て/扌 + 宿 + ぬ/力  =  拐

Compounds of 臼

  -  ぬ/力 + の/禾  =  毀
  -  火 + ぬ/力 + の/禾  =  燬
  -  け/犬 + selector 6 + ぬ/力  =  舂
  -  氷/氵 + 宿 + ぬ/力  =  滔
  -  れ/口 + 宿 + ぬ/力  =  啗
  -  ぬ/力 + 宿 + と/戸  =  舁
  -  え/訁 + 宿 + ぬ/力  =  諂
  -  み/耳 + 宿 + ぬ/力  =  蹈
  -  も/門 + 宿 + ぬ/力  =  閻
  -  さ/阝 + さ/阝 + ぬ/力  =  陷
  -  い/糹/#2 + 宿 + ぬ/力  =  韜
  -  せ/食 + 宿 + ぬ/力  =  餡

Compounds of 匁

  -  selector 1 + 比 + ぬ/力  =  匆

Compounds of 免

  -  ぬ/力 + ぬ/力  =  勉
  -  な/亻 + ぬ/力 + 宿  =  俛
  -  日 + ぬ/力 + 宿  =  冕
  -  ふ/女 + ぬ/力 + 宿  =  娩
  -  う/宀/#3 + ぬ/力 + 宿  =  寃
  -  や/疒 + ぬ/力 + 宿  =  巉
  -  る/忄 + ぬ/力 + 宿  =  悗
  -  い/糹/#2 + ぬ/力 + 宿  =  纔
  -  心 + ぬ/力 + 宿  =  菟
  -  え/訁 + ぬ/力 + 宿  =  讒

Other compounds

  -  む/車 + ぬ/力  =  蠢
  -  さ/阝 + ぬ/力  =  陥
  -  ぬ/力 + は/辶  =  畔
  -  ぬ/力 + ゆ/彳  =  粛
  -  い/糹/#2 + ぬ/力 + ゆ/彳  =  繍
  -  ぬ/力 + ぬ/力 + ゆ/彳  =  肅
  -  れ/口 + ぬ/力 + ゆ/彳  =  嘯
  -  に/氵 + ぬ/力 + ゆ/彳  =  瀟
  -  ち/竹 + ぬ/力 + ゆ/彳  =  簫
  -  心 + ぬ/力 + ゆ/彳  =  蕭
  -  ぬ/力 + ぬ/力 + 数  =  敕
  -  ち/竹 + ち/竹 + ぬ/力  =  效
  -  火 + 宿 + ぬ/力  =  焔
  -  ぬ/力 + ん/止 + の/禾  =  齧
  -  ひ/辶 + 宿 + ぬ/力  =  邉
  -  ひ/辶 + ひ/辶 + ぬ/力  =  邊
  -  に/氵 + 宿 + ぬ/力  =  淵
  -  に/氵 + う/宀/#3 + ぬ/力  =  渊

Notes

Braille patterns